The following list sorts all municipalities (cities, towns and villages) in the Japanese prefecture of Chiba with a population of more than 10,000 according to the 2020 Census. As of October 1, 2020, 46 places fulfill this criterion and are listed here. This list refers only to the population of individual cities, towns and villages within their defined limits, which does not include other municipalities or suburban areas within urban agglomerations.

Population figures are retroactively calculated to correspond to the current, 2010 municipalities and municipal borders (see the List of mergers in Chiba Prefecture for changes).

List 
The following table lists the 46 cities, towns and villages in Chiba with a population of at least 10,000 on October 1, 2020, according to the 2020 Census. The table also gives an overview of the evolution of the population since the 1995 census.

References 

Chiba Prefecture cities